KEZS-FM (102.9 MHz, "K103") is a country music-formatted radio station broadcasting from Cape Girardeau, Missouri. The station plays songs by pop country artists like Thomas Rhett, Kane Brown, and Florida Georgia Line. It is a 100,000-watt station, broadcasting from the KBSI tower near Cape Girardeau.

Ownership
In December 2003, Mississippi River Radio, acting as Max Media LLC (John Trinder, president/COO), reached an agreement to purchase WCIL, WCIL-FM, WJPF, WOOZ-FM, WUEZ, WXLT, KCGQ-FM, KEZS-FM, KGIR, KGKS, KJEZ, KKLR-FM, KLSC, KMAL, KSIM, KWOC, and KZIM from the Zimmer Radio Group (James L. Zimmer, owner). The reported value of this 17 station transaction was $43 million.

References

External links

EZS
Country radio stations in the United States
Radio stations established in 1974
Max Media radio stations
1974 establishments in Missouri